A second-order fluid is a fluid where the stress tensor is the sum of all tensors that can be formed from the velocity field with up to two derivatives, much as a Newtonian fluid is formed from derivatives up to first order. This model may be obtained from a retarded motion expansion truncated at the second-order.  For an isotropic, incompressible second-order fluid, the total stress tensor is given by

where 
 is the indeterminate spherical stress due to the constraint of incompressibility,
 is the -th Rivlin–Ericksen tensor,
 is the zero-shear viscosity,

References

Bird, RB., Armstrong, RC., Hassager, O., Dynamics of Polymeric Liquids: Second Edition, Volume 1: Fluid Mechanics.  John Wiley and Sons 1987 (v.1)
Bird R.B, Stewart W.E, Light Foot E.N.: Transport phenomena, John Wiley and Sons, Inc. New York, U.S.A., 1960

Non-Newtonian fluids